Carr Vale is a small village attached to the New Bolsover model village, Bolsover, Derbyshire, England. It is under Bolsover town.

It was begun in the late nineteenth century to house miners of the Bolsover Mining Company.

References

External links

Villages in Derbyshire
Towns and villages of the Peak District
Bolsover